Kathryn Reilly (born 17 September 1988) is an Irish Sinn Féin politician and former member of Seanad Éireann.

She grew up in Ballyjamesduff, County Cavan. She has a degree in economics from Dublin City University, and a master's degree in European economic and public affairs from University College Dublin. She previously worked as a parliamentary assistant to former Sinn Féin TD Arthur Morgan.

She first entered politics for election to Dáil Éireann in the Cavan–Monaghan constituency at the 2011 general election, but was not elected. In April 2011 she was elected to Seanad Éireann on the Industrial and Commercial Panel.

She was the youngest member of the  Oireachtas in 2011; having been elected at age 22, and she is the youngest ever elected member of the Seanad.

She was again an unsuccessful candidate in the Cavan–Monaghan constituency at the 2016 general election.

In March 2016 she confirmed her intention not to run for re-election to the Seanad, saying she felt "cast aside" by the party.

References

External links
Kathryn Reilly's page on the Sinn Féin website

1988 births
Living people
Sinn Féin senators
Members of the 24th Seanad
21st-century women members of Seanad Éireann
Politicians from County Cavan
Alumni of Dublin City University
Alumni of University College Dublin
People from Ballyjamesduff